Pupina is a genus of land snails with an operculum, terrestrial gastropod mollusks in the subfamily Pupillinae of the family Pupinidae. 

According to the Australian Faunal Directory, this genus is a synonym of Signepupina Iredale, 1937

Species 
Species in the genus Pupina include:

 Pupina acehensis Maassen, 2002
 Pupina anceyi Bavay & Dautzenberg, 1899
 Pupina artata Benson, 1856
 Pupina arula Benson, 1856
 Pupina augustae Leschke, 1912
 Pupina aurea Hinds, 1842
 Pupina aureola Stoliczka, 1872
 Pupina bella Wiktor, 1998
 Pupina billeti H. Fischer, 1898
 Pupina bipalatalis O. Boettger, 1890
 Pupina brachysoma Ancey, 1904
 Pupina brazieri (Crosse, 1870)
 Pupina brenchleyi E. A. Smith, 1892
 Pupina compacta Möllendorff, 1897
 Pupina complanata (Pease, 1861)
 Pupina coxeniBrazier, 1875: synonym of Signepupina coxeni (Brazier, 1875) (unaccepted combination)
 Pupina crosseana Morlet, 1883
 Pupina cumingiana L. Pfeiffer, 1854
 Pupina difficilis O. Semper, 1864
 Pupina dohertyi E. A. Smith, 1897
 Pupina doriae Godwin-Austen, 1889: synonym of Tylotoechus doriae (Godwin-Austen, 1889) (unaccepted combination)
 Pupina douvillei Dautzenberg & H. Fischer, 1906
 Pupina ephippium Gredler, 1881
 Pupina evansi Godwin-Austen, 1889: synonym of Tylotoechus evansi (Godwin-Austen, 1889) (unaccepted combination)
 Pupina excisa Möllendorff, 1902
 Pupina exclamationis J. Mabille, 1887
 Pupina falkneri Maassen, 2002
 Pupina flava Möllendorff, 1884
 Pupina flexuosa Wiktor, 1998
 † Pupina fossilis W. Yü & H.-Z. Pan, 1982 
 Pupina fuchsi Gredler, 1885
 Pupina gibba Hedley, 1891
 Pupina gibbosa Yen, 1939
 Pupina gracilis Möllendorff, 1887
 Pupina gravida van Benthem Jutting, 1963
 Pupina hosei Godwin-Austen, 1889: synonym of Tylotoechus hosei (Godwin-Austen, 1889) (unaccepted combination)
 Pupina huntingtoni Clench, 1949
 Pupina illustris J. Mabille, 1887
 Pupina keraudrenii Vignard, 1829
 Pupina macroformis Yen, 1939
 Pupina malkini Solem, 1962
 Pupina menglunensis D.-N. Chen & G.-Q. Zhang, 1998
 Pupina minuta Soós, 1911
 Pupina miokoana Möllendorff, 1897
 Pupina nitidula F. G. Thompson, 1987
 Pupina orophila van Benthem Jutting, 1963
 Pupina perspicua van Benthem Jutting, 1963
 Pupina pfeifferi Dohrn, 1862: synonym of Signepupina pfeifferi (Dohrn, 1862) (original combination)
 Pupina pycnochila van Benthem Jutting, 1963
 Pupina quadrasi Möllendorff, 1894
 Pupina remota Wiktor, 1998
 Pupina robusta van Benthem Jutting, 1963
 Pupina sangkarensis van Benthem Jutting, 1959
 Pupina schneideri I. Rensch, 1937
 Pupina scintillans van Benthem Jutting, 1963
 Pupina smitsi van Benthem Jutting, 1963
 Pupina solomonensis E. A. Smith, 1885
 Pupina sonlaensis D. S. Do, 2017
 Pupina speculum Tapparone Canefri, 1883
 Pupina suavis van Benthem Jutting, 1963
 Pupina teres Iredale, 1941
 Pupina thaitranbaii Do, 2017
 Pupina tortirostris (G. B. Sowerby III, 1917)
 Pupina vanheurni van Benthem Jutting, 1933
 Pupina variegata Wiktor, 1998
 Pupina verneaui Dautzenberg & H. Fischer, 1906
 Pupina vitiensis Garrett, 1873

References

 Vignard, M. 1829. Description du Maillotin (Pupina), nouveau genera de coquilles. Annales des Sciences Naturelles, Paris 18: 439-440

 
Pupinidae
Taxonomy articles created by Polbot